Year 1458 (MCDLVIII) was a common year starting on Sunday (link will display the full calendar) of the Julian calendar, the 1458th year of the Common Era (CE) and Anno Domini (AD) designations, the 458th year of the 2nd millennium, the 58th year of the 15th century, and the 9th year of the 1450s decade.

Events 
 January–December 
 January 24 – Matthias Corvinus becomes king of Hungary, at age 14.
 March 25 – The Loveday is staged in London, by which Henry VI of England attempts to unite the warring factions who have triggered the War of the Roses.
 August 19 – Pope Pius II succeeds Pope Callixtus III, as the 210th pope.
 October 24 – King Afonso V of Portugal conquers Ksar es-Seghir, in North Africa.

 Date unknown 
 Magdalen College, Oxford, is founded.
 George of Poděbrady becomes king of Bohemia.
 The Ottoman authorities issue a decree to protect the Acropolis, after they conquer Athens. 
 The Jewish community is expelled from Erfurt (Germany); their houses are sold, and the synagogue turned into an arsenal.
 Moctezuma I, Tlatoani of Tenochtitlán, leads an expedition to the city-state Coixtlahuaca in Mixtec territory, but is defeated.
 A major volcano erupts.

Births 
 February 15 – Ivan the Young, Ruler of Tver (d. 1490)
 April 9 – Camilla Battista da Varano, Italian saint (d. 1524)
 April 13 – John II, Duke of Cleves (d. 1521)
 May 2 – Eleanor of Viseu, Portuguese princess and later Queen of Portugal (d. 1525)
 August 18 – Lorenzo Pucci, Italian Catholic cardinal (d. 1531)
 October 3 – Saint Casimir, Prince of Poland and Duke of Lithuania (d. 1484)
 October 16 – Adolph II, Prince of Anhalt-Köthen, German prince (d. 1526)
 December 25 – Amago Tsunehisa, Japanese warlord (d. 1541)
 date unknown
 Jacob Obrecht, Dutch composer (d. 1505)
 Jacopo Sannazaro, Italian poet (d. 1530)
 probable
 Thomas Docwra, Grand Prior of the English Knights Hospitaller (d. 1527)
 Richard Grey, half brother of Edward V of England (d. 1483)

Deaths 
 January 17 – Louis I, Landgrave of Hesse, Landgrave of Hesse (1413-1458) (b. 1402)
 February 20 – Lazar Branković, Despot of Serbia
 March 25 – Íñigo López de Mendoza, 1st Marquis of Santillana, Spanish poet (b. 1398)
 April 11 – Helena Palaiologina, Queen of Cyprus (b. 1428)
 June 27 – King Alfonso V of Aragon (b. 1396)
 July 28 – John II of Cyprus
 August 6 – Pope Callixtus III (b. 1378)
 September 7 – Maria of Castile, Queen of Aragon, Queen consort of Aragon and Naples (b. 1401)
 December 26 – Arthur III, Duke of Brittany (b. 1393)
 date unknown – Isabelle Romée, mother of Joan of Arc

References